Resist dyeing (resist-dyeing) is a traditional method of dyeing textiles with patterns. Methods are used to "resist" or prevent the dye from reaching all the cloth, thereby creating a pattern and ground. The most common forms use wax, some type of paste made from starch or mud, or a mechanical resist that manipulates the cloth such as tying or stitching. Another form of resist involves using a chemical agent in a specific type of dye that will repel another type of dye printed over the top. The best-known varieties today include tie-dye, batik, and ikat.

Basic methods

Wax or paste
In wax or paste resists, melted wax or some form of paste is applied to cloth before being dipped in dye. Wherever the resist medium has seeped through the fabric, the dye will not penetrate. Sometimes several colors are used, with a series of steps including dyeing, drying, and the repeated application of the resist. The resist may also be applied to another piece of cloth to make a stencil, which is then placed over the cloth, and dye applied to the assembly; this is known as resist printing.

Stencils
In stencilled resists, a stencil is placed over the fabric where it is to be shielded from ink, similar to how screen prints are made.

Mechanical
Mechanical resist dyeing ties, stitched or clamps the cloth using clothespegs or wooden blocks to shield areas of the fabric from the dye.

Chemical
Chemical resist dyeing is a modern textile printing method, commonly achieved using two different classes of fiber reactive dyes, one of which must be of the vinyl sulfone type. A chemical-resisting agent is combined with dye Type A, and printed using the screenprint method and allowed to dry. A second dye, Type B, is then printed overtop. The resist agent in Type A chemically prevents Type B from reacting with the fabric, resulting in a crisp pattern/ground relationship.

History
Resist dyeing has been very widely used in Asia, Africa, and Europe since ancient times. The earliest extant pieces of resist-dyed fabric were found in Egypt, dating to the 4th century AD. Cloths used for mummy wrappings were sometimes coated with wax, scratched with a sharp stylus, and dyed with a mixture of blood and ashes. After dyeing, the cloth was washed in hot water to remove the wax.

In Asia, this technique was practiced in China during the Tang dynasty (618–907 AD), Indonesia, India, and Japan in the Nara period (645–794 AD). In Africa, it was originally practiced by the Yoruba people in Nigeria, and the Soninke and Wolof in Senegal.

Traditions using wax or paste

 Guizhou Province, China, has a strong tradition of wax-resist dyeing.
 Indonesia is known for their batik traditions
 In Africa, the Yoruba people of Nigeria use cassava paste as a resist, while the people of Senegal use rice paste. Madiba shirts are also well-known for their resist-dyed patterns.

Traditions using tying or stitching
 Indonesia is well-known for the tradition of ikat weaving, where only the warp or weft is dyed before a fabric is woven.
 Indian textiles featured tied or stitched resists.
 The Yoruba people of Nigeria produce Adire textiles, which are tied before being dyed with indigo
 In Japan,  is a tie-dye technique known for its use on kimono and other traditional textiles. It has been produced in Japan for centuries, following the technique's likely introduction from China.

Traditions using printing
 In Japan, both  and  use stencilled resist-dyeing methods to create highly-detailed resist-dyed fabrics.  is a block-resist dyeing method that was common throughout the Meiji period (1868-1912), used to create red lining fabrics with crisp white designs.
 In China, the  method, invented around 500 AD, uses wooden blocks to dye patterns onto fabric, usually silk. An upper and a lower block is made, with carved out compartments opening to the back, fitted with plugs. The cloth, usually folded a number of times, is inserted and clamped between the two blocks. By unplugging the different compartments and filling them with dyes of different colours, a multi-coloured pattern can be printed over quite a large area of folded cloth.

Other traditions

 Ukraine, Russia and Poland – Pysanka, with wax for eggs at Easter

See also
Batik
Woodblock printing
Byzantine dress

References

Textile arts